The  National Museum in Lublin is one of the oldest and largest museums in Eastern Poland, located in Lublin. It was created in 1914, and received its own building in 1923.

History

The history of the Lublin Museum dates back to the beginning of the 20th century, and is associated with Hieronim Łopaciński, a junior high school teacher and a correspondent of the Academy of Learning, amateur historian, ethnographer, bibliophile and lover of antiquity. Thanks to his efforts in 1901, two exhibitions were organized in Lublin. The exhibition of art and antiquities was opened on June 4 in the former Dominican Monastery. Approximately 4,000 exhibits were assembled – engravings, paintings, sculptures, decorative arts, documents, prints, manuscripts, excavated artefacts, guild artefacts, arms, coins, medals, stamps and maps. The industrial and agricultural exhibition was opened on June 22 with ethnographic section where folk costumes, wooden products and ritual art were presented.

In 1974, the premises of Lublin Castle were adapted for the needs of the District Museum in Lublin, established in 1950.  The permanent exhibitions of painting, decorative arts, armaments, archeological, ethnographic, and numismatic artefacts were opened. In 1987 the museum was renamed the Lublin Museum.

On 15 May 2020, the Lublin Museum was nationalized, and therefore officially promoted to the rank of a National Museum, seamlessly the ownership of museum was transferred from the local government (pol. Sejmik Województwa) and placed under the authority of Polish Ministry of Culture.

Permanent collection
It has permanent collections for:
 Polish and foreign painting from the 17th to 20th century;
 Polish and foreign decorative arts;
 Polish historical and battle paintings;
 Painters and folk art from the Lublin Region;
 Coins and medals in Polish territories from the 10th to the 20th century;
 Polish and foreign armaments from the 14th to the 20th century.

Gallery

See also
List of museums in Poland

References

External links

Homepage 
culture.pl

National museums of Poland
Museums in Lublin Voivodeship
Buildings and structures in Lublin
Art museums and galleries in Poland
Numismatic museums in Poland
Registered museums in Poland